Microplane is a registered trademark of Grace Manufacturing Inc., a company that makes photo etched steel tools (surform tools) for grating, grinding and sanding. It was created by Richard Grace in the mid-'90s. Grace set out to make a wood-carving rasper and ended up with a new invention, which in 1991 would come to be called Microplane.

Kitchen graters

Microplane graters are used for the grating of various food items, such as nutmeg and cheese, and also as zesters for citrus fruit.

Wood rasps
Microplane originally made wood rasps and shaving disks, and they still do.

Further reading

References

External links
 Microplane Official Website
 Grace Manufacturing Inc. Official Website

Food preparation utensils
Woodworking hand tools
Kitchenware brands